Franz Pavuza (19 May 1920 – 10 August 1973) was an Austrian footballer. He played in seven matches for the Austria national football team from 1946 to 1947.

References

External links
 

1920 births
1973 deaths
Austrian footballers
Austria international footballers
Place of birth missing
Association footballers not categorized by position